SevenStar Scenic Area, formerly Seven Star Park, is located in Qixing district. The park itself encompasses 7 hills, hence its name.

Attractions

Seven-star Cave 

An extensive limestone cave complex in the park.

External links
 

Parks in Guangxi